The 1917 Giro di Lombardia was the 13th edition of the Giro di Lombardia cycle race and was held on 4 November 1917. The race started and finished in Milan. The race was won by Philippe Thys of the Peugeot team.

General classification

References

1917
Giro di Lombardia
Giro di Lombardia